The Amur Liman is a liman of the Amur River, the northern part of the Strait of Tartary between Eurasia and Sakhalin. It connects the Sakhalin Gulf of the Sea of Okhotsk with the main body of the Strait of Tartary via the Nevelskoy Strait.

"Amur Liman" is often translated as "Amur Estuary" or "Amur Mouth".

References

Bodies of water of Sakhalin Oblast
Bays of the Sea of Okhotsk
Bodies of water of Russia